Olga Bołądź (born 29 February 1984) is a Polish actress. She has appeared in more than thirty films since 2006.

Selected filmography

References

External links 

1984 births
Living people
Polish film actresses